The 2020 Delray Beach Open was a professional men's tennis tournament played on hard courts. It was the 28th edition of the tournament, and part of the 2020 ATP Tour. It took place in Delray Beach, Florida, United States between 17 February and 23 February 2020.

Singles main-draw entrants

Seeds

1 Rankings as of February 10, 2020

Other entrants 
The following players received wildcards into the main draw:
  Ryan Harrison
  Brandon Nakashima
  Jack Sock

The following players received entry into the singles main draw using a protected ranking:
  Mackenzie McDonald
  Cedrik-Marcel Stebe

The following player received entry as a special exempt:
  Jason Jung

The following players received entry from the qualifying draw:
  Emilio Gómez
  Ernests Gulbis 
  Cameron Norrie 
  Noah Rubin

The following players received entry as lucky losers:
  Daniel Elahi Galán
  Stefan Kozlov
  Denis Istomin
  Bernard Tomic

Withdrawals 
Before the tournament
  Kyle Edmund → replaced by  Stefan Kozlov
  Nick Kyrgios  → replaced by  Daniel Elahi Galán
  Kei Nishikori → replaced by  Henri Laaksonen
  Tennys Sandgren → replaced by  Bernard Tomic
  Andreas Seppi → replaced by  Denis Istomin

Retirements 
  Jason Jung
  Jordan Thompson

Doubles main-draw entrants

Seeds 

1 Rankings are as of February 10, 2020.

Other entrants 
The following pairs received wildcards into the main draw:
  Christian Harrison /  Dennis Novikov
  Nicholas Monroe /  Jackson Withrow

Withdrawals 
Before the tournament
  Matt Reid
  Jordan Thompson

Champions

Singles 

  Reilly Opelka def.  Yoshihito Nishioka, 7–5, 6–7(4–7), 6–2

Doubles 

  Bob Bryan /  Mike Bryan def.  Luke Bambridge /  Ben McLachlan, 3–6, 7–5, [10–5]

References

External links
Official website

Delray Beach Open
Delray Beach Open
Delray Beach Open
Delray Beach
Delray Beach Open